The Mad Bad Ad Show is a British comedy panel show made by Objective Productions and hosted by Mark Dolan. It aired for one season on Channel 4 in 2012.

Format
The premise of the show is based around answering questions about and related to advertisements, with the two team captains, Mark Watson and Micky Flanagan, each also making an advertisement of their own for a fictitious product which they also have to invent.

The programme consists of two teams, each featuring, alongside the captains, one other comedian and one advertising professional.

Episode list
The coloured backgrounds denote the result of each of the shows:

 – Indicates Micky's team won
 – Indicates Mark's team won

References

External links

2010s British comedy television series
2012 British television series debuts
2012 British television series endings
Channel 4 comedy
English-language television shows
British panel games
2010s British game shows
Television series by All3Media